Nigger is an ethnic slur typically directed at black people.

Nigger may also refer to:

Literature
The Nigger, a 1909 play by Edward Sheldon
 Nigger: An Autobiography by Dick Gregory, a book, 1964
 Nigger: The Strange Career of a Troublesome Word, a book by Randall Kennedy, 2002

Music
 "Nigger, Nigger", and other songs using nigger in their title, by Johnny Rebel in the 1960s
 "Nigger", a 1993 song by Clawfinger
 Untitled Nas album, originally titled Nigger, 2008

Other uses
 Nigger (dog), a black labrador belonging to a British air force officer; both dog and man feature in the film Dambusters
 Nigger butterfly, historic name for Orsotriaena medus

See also

 Nigg (disambiguation)
 Niggerhead (disambiguation)
 N-word (disambiguation)
 Niger (disambiguation)
 List of ethnic slurs
 Nigga, a colloquial term derived from nigger
 Nigger in the woodpile, an American figure of speech (late 19th-early 20th centuries)
The Nigger of the Narcissus, an 1897 novel by Joseph Conrad
Use of nigger in proper names
Use of nigger in the arts
Controversies about the word niggardly